Johann Hinrich Klapmeyer (ca. 1690 – 23 November 1757) was a German organ builder.

Life 
Born in Krempe, Klapmeyer presumably learned the trade from his father Johann (Jean) Werner Klapmeyer, who had been a journeyman with Arp Schnitger and was involved, among other things, in the construction of the organ in Wittmund. In 1729, he acquired the citizenship of Glückstadt and worked there as an organ and instrument maker On the side, he ran a hostelry with an inn. From 1733 onwards, he was in conflict with his competitors Lambert Daniel Kastens and Johann Dietrich Busch, who ran a workshop in Itzehoe. After petitioning the Danish king five times, Klapmeyer received the longed-for organ building concession for life for the area of Schleswig-Holstein in 1735. In the last years of his life he was in poor health and worked in his inn. His journeyman Johann Joachim Maaß took over the organ work. After Klapmeyer's death in 1758, the privilege was transferred to his widow, who commissioned Maaß with the work. In 1763, Maaß received the privilege from her.

List of work

References

Further reading 

 
 
 

 

German pipe organ builders
Date of birth missing
1757 deaths
People from Steinburg